A national scenic area (NSA) is a conservation designation used in several countries.

China

Taiwan

National scenic areas in Taiwan are:
 Alishan National Scenic Area in Chiayi County
 Maolin National Scenic Area in Kaohsiung City and Pingtung County
 Northeast Coast National Scenic Area in New Taipei City and Yilan County
 Penghu National Scenic Area in Penghu County
 Siraya National Scenic Area in Chiayi County and Tainan City
 Southwest Coast National Scenic Area in Chiayi County, Tainan City and Yunlin County

United Kingdom

In Scotland national scenic areas (NSAs) are defined as areas having outstanding scenic interest or unsurpassed attractiveness. They are administered by NatureScot. There are 40 designated NSAs in Scotland, covering 13% of the country's land area. The primary purpose of the NSA designations is to conserve and enhance the natural beauty of the landscape, in a similar way to the Area of Outstanding Natural Beauty (AONB) designation used elsewhere in the UK. AONBs were created under the  National Parks and Access to the Countryside Act 1949, which applies to England, Wales and Northern Ireland. This act allows areas of countryside with significant landscape value in each of the three nations to be designated by their respective governments.

United States

See also
Area of Outstanding Natural Beauty
European Landscape Convention

References